The 1998 Algarve Cup was the fifth edition of the Algarve Cup, an invitational women's association football tournament. It took place between 15  and 21 March 1998 in Portugal with Norway winning the event for the fourth time in its history defeating Denmark, 4-1, in the final-game. The USA ended up third defeating Sweden, 3-1, in the third prize game.

Format
The United States returned to the tournament, replacing Iceland.

The eight invited teams were split into two groups that played a round-robin tournament. On completion of this, the fourth placed teams in each group would play each other to determine seventh and eighth place, the third placed teams in each group would play each other to decide fifth and sixth place, the second placed teams in each group would play to determine third and fourth place and the winners of each group would compete for first and second place overall.

Points awarded in the group stage followed the standard formula of three points for a win, one point for a draw and zero points for a loss.

Group A

Group B

Seventh Place

Portugal finished bottom of their group for the fifth year in a row but won the match to decide seventh place on penalties after a 2–2 draw with Finland.

Fifth Place

Third Place

Final

Awards

References

External links
1998 Algarve Cup on RSSSF

1998
1998 in women's association football
1997–98 in Portuguese football
1998 in Norwegian women's football
1997–98 in Danish football
1998 in American women's soccer
1998 in Chinese football
1997–98 in Dutch football
1998 in Finnish football
1998 in Swedish women's football
March 1998 sports events in Europe
1998 in Portuguese women's sport